The women's team competition of the 2013 World Judo Championships was held on 1 September.

Medalists

References

External links
 

Wteam
World Women's Team Judo Championships
World 2013
World Wteam